The Sammarinese Democratic Party is a reformist Sammarinese political party.

Political parties in San Marino